Luís Germano Pires Lopes de Almeida (born 18 May 1990), commonly known as Kiki Ballack, is a Cape Verdean footballer who plays for Sintrense. He played in the Segunda Liga for Farense and Mafra.

References

1990 births
Living people
Sportspeople from Praia
Cape Verdean footballers
Association football defenders
C.D. Santa Clara players
U.D. Oliveirense players
U.D. Leiria players
Sertanense F.C. players
S.C. Farense players
C.D. Mafra players
S.U. Sintrense players
Segunda Divisão players
Liga Portugal 2 players
Cape Verdean expatriate footballers
Expatriate footballers in Portugal